Fernand Le Rachinel (born 4 June 1942) is a French politician and Member of the European Parliament for the north-west of France. He is a member of the National Front, and is therefore a Non-Inscrit in the European Parliament. He sits on the European Parliament's Committee on Transport and Tourism.

Le Rachinel is also a substitute for the Committee on Industry, Research and Energy and a member of the delegation for relations with the Korean Peninsula. He entered the European Parliament on 22 October 2004, replacing Chantal Simonot, who resigned on 1 October.

Career
 Certificate of elementary education
 Active military service in Algeria (1962–1963)
 Meilleur Ouvrier de France in printing
 Former president of commercial court
 Former union chairman
 Honorary member of Manche Departmental Council
 Member of Lower Normandy Regional council
 Member of the European Parliament (1994–1999)
 Knight of the National Order of Merit

References
 European Parliament biography

External links
 Declaration of financial interests (in French; PDF file)

1942 births
Living people
People from Manche
Politicians from Normandy
National Rally (France) politicians
MEPs for North-West France 2004–2009
MEPs for France 1994–1999
MEPs for France 1999–2004
National Rally (France) MEPs
Knights of the Ordre national du Mérite